Hon. Caleb Sipple Layton (April 12, 1798 – October 3, 1882) was at various stages of his life a lawyer, member of the Delaware House of Representatives, a Delaware State Senator, Secretary of State of Delaware, and Associate Justice of the Delaware Superior Court. He was a resident of Sussex County, Delaware.

Early life 
Caleb S. Layton was born on the family homestead to Lowder Layton and Sarah, daughter of Caleb Sipple, of Kent County. He was the oldest of a family of six sons and three daughters. Soon after his birth the family moved to Milton, Delaware, where he was educated at local schools. He subsequently received more advanced instruction at the Philadelphia Grammar School. After completing his academic courses he returned to his native county and engaged in business with his father. On October 14, 1819, he married Penelope, daughter of Governor Caleb Rodney and Elizabeth West. The following year he was appointed Clerk of the Peace for Sussex County. He resigned this office in 1822, and entered upon the study of law with Thomas Cooper of Georgetown, one of the leading members of the Sussex bar. At the session of the State Legislature in 1824–25 he served as clerk of the Delaware Lower House, and was admitted to practice as an attorney-at-law in 1826. He died in Georgetown Delaware

Career in Law and Politics 
Layton soon established a wide reputation for himself as a wise counselor and a zealous and popular advocate before the jury. In 1826 he was elected a member of the Lower House of the State Legislature, and was re-elected for several successive terms. In 1830 he was elected a member of the Delaware Senate.

During the administration of Governor David Hazzard he served as Secretary of State of Delaware and was again appointed to the same office by Governor Charles Polk in 1836. While occupying this position he was appointed an Associate Justice of the Superior Court of Delaware, and occupied that place until July 1844, when, owing to the insufficiency of the fiscal returns from the office, he was compelled to resign. He returned to the practice of his profession in Georgetown and continued to be a respected leader of the Delaware bar.

Aside from his professional prominence, Judge Layton exerted a wide influence in the domain of politics. He advocated the principles and sustained the purposes of the political organization to which he belonged. Originally he identified with the Federalist and Whig parties, and transitioned into the Republican Party as the American Civil War drew closer. He was noted by local historians to have been a forcible speaker, a close and accurate reasoner and a recognized leader in political life from 1825 until within a few years of his demise. He was the author of the free school system of the State, having caused the bill to be introduced and established. He was strongly opposed to slavery, and, as a member of the Legislature, caused the first abolition bill to be introduced in the State of Delaware.

Non-professional life and Family 
Layton was a member of the Episcopal Church. He was noted to have been of an amiable character and recorded to have had pleasing address, polished manners and to have been an intelligent conversationalist. Physically, he was said to have been erect and graceful, even at a very advanced age, and he preserved in a remarkable degree the manly strength and development of earlier years. Finally, at an advanced age, he died after a brief illness.

His father died on June 26, 1849. Judge Layton's first wife died in July, 1855. She had nine children, as follows: 
 Dr. Joseph R. Layton
 William L. Layton – died young
 Samuel H. Layton – lived in Frankford, Delaware and was later the father of another Caleb R. Layton
 Caleb R. Layton – rose to Colonel in the army of the United States and later died August 20, 1887
 Sarah E. Layton – died young
 Hester A. – died young
 Daniel J. Layton – a prominent citizen and resident of Georgetown
 Penelope McKim – wife of Rev. John Linn McKim
 Lavinia J. Plummer – married Rev. George F. Plummer.

For his second wife Judge Layton married Anna M., daughter of Dr. William Morris, of Dover, Delaware. She died in the fall of 1886.

References 
 History of Delaware 1609 -1888 by Thomas J. Scharf

Secretaries of State of Delaware
Members of the Delaware House of Representatives
Delaware state senators
Associate Judges of Delaware
1798 births
1882 deaths
Delaware Federalists
Delaware Whigs
19th-century American politicians
Delaware Republicans
People from Georgetown, Delaware
People from Milton, Delaware
County officials in Delaware
19th-century American judges
Rodney family of Delaware